The Paris Bourbonites was the initial moniker of the minor league baseball teams based in Paris, Kentucky. Paris teams played as members of the Blue Grass League from 1909 to 1912, Ohio State League in 1914 and Blue Grass League from 1922 to 1924. Paris teams won league championships in 1910, 1911 and 1924 and hosted home games at Bourbon County Park.

History
Minor league baseball began in Paris, Kentucky in 1909. The "Paris Bourbonites" became members of the 1909 Class D level Blue Grass League, which was playing its second season. The Paris team moniker was in corresponds to Paris, Kentucky being located within Bourbon County, Kentucky. 

In their first season of play, the Paris Bourbonites finished with a record of 61–57. Paris placed 3rd in the six–team league, playing under managers Jeff Elgin, Henry Schmidt and James Barnett. The Bourbonites finished 13.5 games behind the 1st place Winchester Hustlers in the final standings.

In their second season of play, the 1910 Paris Bourbonites won the Blue Grass League championship in convincing fashion. With a record of 80–47, Paris placed 1st in the regular season standings, playing under manager Edward McKernan. Paris finished 10.0 games ahead of the 2nd place Lexington Colts in the final standings. Paris pitcher Milton McCormick led the Blue Grass League in win percentage at .850 and a 17–3 record. The Blue Grass League held no playoffs in 1910.

Paris won their second consecutive Blue Grass League Championship in 1911. The Blue Grass League played a split–season schedule in 1911, with the winners of each half season meeting in the Finals. Under returning manager Edward McKernan, the Bourbonites had a 71–44 overall record and were 6.0 games ahead of the 2nd place Lexington Colts in the final regular season standings. Paris qualified for the Finals by winning the first–half standings. The Winchester Hustlers won of the second–half standings. In the Finals, the Paris Bourbonites swept the Winchester Hustlers 4 games to 0 to defend their championship. Paris player Walter Mayer led the Blue Grass League in hitting in 1911, with a .352 average.
 
The 1912 Paris Bourbonites placed 5th in the Blue Grass League, as the league folded after the season concluded. The opening day at Paris in 1912 featured a parade featuring the 14–member Paris High School Band and players from Paris and the Winchester Husters. On September 3, 1912 Paris pitcher Fred Applegate, tied a minor league record by recording 20 strikeouts in a game against the Mt. Sterling Orphans.  With a record of 60–69 under managers Joe Lewis and Danning Harrell, the Bourbonites finished 4.0 games behind the Frankfort Lawmakers and no playoffs were held. With a record of 85–42, Frankfort was followed in the standings by the Maysville Rivermen (82–47), Lexington Colts (60–65), Paris Bourbonites (60–69), Richmond Pioneers (66–64) and Winchester Hustlers/Mt. Sterling Orphans (31–97) in the standings. Paris player/manager Danning Harrell led the Blue Grass League, hitting .401 and Paris pitcher Jim Hauser led the league with 23 wins. The Blue Grass League folded following the 1912 season.

Paris briefly returned to minor league play in 1914, as Paris became members of the 1914 eight–team Class D level Ohio State League. The Newport, Kentucky franchise, which entered the Ohio State League play on May 26, 1914,  moved to Paris on June 16, 1914. The team had a 16–27 record playing as the Newport Brewers. After a 3–22 record while based in Paris, the team disbanded on July 5, 1914. At the time the Newport/Paris team folded, the team had an overall 19–49 record under managers Charles Applegate and Red Munson.

Paris resumed Blue Grass League play in 1922 and won the pennant. The Paris Bourbons returned to play as members of the Class D level Blue Grass League, which reformed as a six–team league. Some references have Paris playing under the "Mammoths" moniker in 1922. With the Blue Grass League playing a split–season schedule, the Paris Bourbons finished the overall regular season in 1st place with a 36–28 record under managers B. Goodman and Harold Willis, ending the season 1.5 games ahead of the 2nd place Maysville Cardinals. However, the Maysville Cardinals, with a 16–6 record, won the 1st half standings and the Cynthiana Merchants, with a 25–17 record, won the 2nd half standings, as the Blue Grass league played the split–season schedule in 1922. In the Finals, Maysville defeated the Cynthiana to win the championship. Pitcher Ray Miner of Paris and Maysville led the Blue Grass League with 15 wins.

The Paris Bourbons placed 4th in the 1923 Blue Grass League standings, playing under managers Nick Winger and Felix Cicona. With a 45–47 record, the Bourbons finished 6.5 games behind the 1st place Cynthiana Cobblers in the final standings. The teams in the 1923 standings were the Cynthiana Cobblers (54-43), Winchester Dodgers (53–44), Maysville Cardinals (48–45), Paris Bourbons (45–47), Lexington Reos (44–49) and Mount Sterling Essex (38–54). Maysville and Mt. Sterling permanently folded following the 1923 season.

In their final season of play, the Paris Bourbons won the 1924 Blue Grass League Championship in the four–team league. With a record of 51–43 under managers Bob Corkhill, Pat Devereaux and Fritz Mueller, Paris finished just a 0.5 game ahead of the 2nd place Cynthiana Cobblers (50–42) in the standings. No playoffs were held and the Blue Grass League permanently folded after the 1924 season.

Paris, Kentucky has not hosted another minor league team.

The ballpark
Beginning in 1909, Paris teams reportedly played home games at Bourbon County Park. The park is still in use and is located at 30 Legion Road, Paris, Kentucky. It was also noted that the Paris Bourbonites played games at White Park in 1911 and 1912.

Timeline

Year–by–year record

Notable alumni

Ernie Alten (1914)
Fred Applegate (1912)
Win Ballou (1922)
Harry Daubert (1914)
Stump Edington (1910)
Don Hurst (1924) 1932 NL RBI leader
Al Kaiser (1910)
Wally Mayer (1911)
Ray Miner (1922, 1924)
Fred Mollenkamp (1912)
Ed Monroe (1912)
Red Munson (1914, MGR)
John Scheneberg (1909-1911)
Jim Scott (1909-1910)
Ralph Shafer (1914)
George Shears (1911)
Ray Shook (1912)

See also
Paris Bourbonites playersParis Bourbons players

References

External links
Baseball Reference

Professional baseball teams in Kentucky
Defunct baseball teams in Kentucky
Baseball teams established in 1909
Baseball teams disestablished in 1912
Blue Grass League teams
Paris, Kentucky
1909 establishments in Kentucky
1912 disestablishments in Kentucky